Eusebio Blankendal (born 3 November 1998) is a Bermudian footballer who plays as a defender for Dandy Town Hornets and the Bermuda national team.

Club career
Blankendal began his club career with Dandy Town Hornets. He was influential in their 5–2 victory over Robin Hood in the 2019 Dudley Eve Trophy Final, nine days before earning his first international cap.

He has also played in the Bermuda Men's Futsal League with Atletico CP.

International career
Blankendal received his first callup to the Bermuda national team in November 2019 as one of three emergency replacement players summoned by manager Kyle Lightbourne ahead of their final game in the CONCACAF Nations League group stage. He made his senior international debut on 19 November as the starting left-back in their 2–1 loss to Mexico. 

Blankendal later participated in the 2022 FIFA World Cup qualifiers, during which he wore the captain's armband for the first time in a 6–0 defeat to Suriname. He served in his role on an interim basis following an injury to Lejuan Simmons, and was retained as captain for their final qualifier against the Cayman Islands a few days later.

Career statistics

International

Honours

Club
Dandy Town Hornets
 Dudley Eve Trophy: 2019

Personal life
Blankendal attended The Berkeley Institute, and interned with local IT firm Oxygen during his studies.

References

External links
 Bermuda Football Association profile
 
 
 

Living people
1998 births
Bermudian footballers
Bermuda international footballers
Association football defenders
Dandy Town Hornets F.C. players